Julius Indus was a nobleman of the Gaulish Treveri tribe. In 21 CE he helped the Romans put down a rebellion of the Treveri and Aedui. Indus had a personal vendetta with one of the leaders in the revolt, Julius Florus. Culminating in a confrontation between the two in the Ardennes forest. During this fight, Indus had the chance to kill Florus, he did so with no hesitation. His regiment may have been involved in the Roman invasion of Britain, and was certainly posted at Corinum (Cirencester) in the mid-to-late 1st century. His daughter, Julia Pacata, married the procurator of Roman Britain, Gaius Julius Alpinus Classicianus, and buried him in London in 65 CE.

External links
Ala Gallorum Indiana at Roman-Britain.org
Tomb of C. Julius Alpinus Classicianus

Celtic warriors
Gaulish people
Ancient Romans in Britain
1st-century Gallo-Roman people
Indus

References